Phillips-Sprague Mine, also known as the Beckley Exhibition Coal Mine, is a historic coal mine located at New River Park in Beckley, Raleigh County, West Virginia.

The mine opened about 1889 on what had been operated as a drift mine. Commercial development of the drift mine began in 1905 and the first coal was shipped on January 4, 1906. Mine operations ceased in 1953, and the property sold to the City of Beckley.

The Beckley Exhibition Coal Mine opened in 1962, as the first historic site wholly dedicated to educating the public about coal mining.  It consists of 1,500 feet of restored passageways and entries with 3,000 feet of vintage track.  It reopened to the public on April 1, 2008.  It is a preserved coal mine that offers daily tours and a history lesson on coal mining in Appalachia.

It was listed on the National Register of Historic Places in 1988.

References

External links
 Beckley Exhibition Coal Mine - City of Beckley

History museums in West Virginia
Industrial buildings and structures on the National Register of Historic Places in West Virginia
1889 establishments in West Virginia
Buildings and structures in Raleigh County, West Virginia
Museums in Raleigh County, West Virginia
Mining museums in the United States
National Register of Historic Places in Raleigh County, West Virginia
Industrial buildings completed in 1889
Coal mines in the United States
Energy infrastructure on the National Register of Historic Places